The Springfield Model 1888 was one of several models of rifles produced by Springfield Armory for the United States military in the late 19th century. It was the final design in a long line of rifles which used the trapdoor breechblock design developed by Erskine S. Allin in the 1860s and the last single-shot rifle to see American military service.

Despite the replacement of the trapdoor rifles by the adoption of newer repeating rifles, they were manufactured until 1893 and saw combat during the Spanish–American War, a war that was dominated by the newer Springfield Krag–Jørgensen bolt action rifle.

History and design

The trapdoor Springfields had originally been produced with reworked bayonets left over from the Civil War. When supplies of these bayonets ran low, Springfield Armory attempted to create a new design, as these bayonets were considered to be obsolete.

For the Springfield Model 1880, Springfield Armory had attempted to combine the bayonet and cleaning rod into a single unit. This model had not been successful, due to problems with the bayonet/cleaning rod retaining mechanism and poor ballistic performance of the weapon due to the heavy forward mounting mechanism.

The Model 1888 was Springfield's last attempt at producing a combined cleaning rod and bayonet design. The Model 1888 was based on the Springfield Model 1873 line of rifles, which had undergone several refinements which had been incorporated into the Springfield Model 1884. Unlike the earlier Model 1880, the Model 1888 used a round rod bayonet design.

The Model 1888 proved to be much more successful than the Model 1880. Between 1890 and 1893, over 60,000 Model 1888 rifles were produced.

During the Spanish–American War, regular army troops were generally issued the new Krag rifles, while guard units were often issued older trapdoor Springfields, typically Model 1884 or Model 1888 rifles. Ultimately, the Springfield Model 1888 would be completely replaced by the newer and more efficient Krag design until 1903, when the Krag itself was replaced with the more efficient M1903 Springfield. Although the Model 1888 Springfield proved to be the most developed and efficient of the Springfield trapdoor rifles, it was simply no match for the advanced technology then available and in use around the world. The Springfield trapdoor rifles never saw military service again.

See also
 Springfield rifle

References

External links

Springfield firearms
Hinged breechblock rifles
Rifles of the United States
Guns of the American West